The NER Class P2 (LNER Class J26) was a class of 0-6-0 steam locomotives of the North Eastern Railway. All 50 locomotives survived into British Railways ownership in 1948 and their BR numbers were BR 65730-65779 renumbered from LNER 5730-5779 . None survive into preservation. The design is based on the P1 and Class P. All were withdrawn from 1952-1966 and scrapped.

References

0-6-0 locomotives
P2
Railway locomotives introduced in 1904
Scrapped locomotives
Standard gauge steam locomotives of Great Britain

Freight locomotives